Gusheh (also Romanized as Gūsheh; also known as Gūsheh Chehār Chinār and Gūsheh-ye Chahār Chenār) is a village in Silakhor Rural District, Silakhor District, Dorud County, Lorestan Province, Iran. At the 2006 census, its population was 536, in 144 families.

References 

Towns and villages in Dorud County